Hiwi, the German abbreviation of the word Hilfswilliger or, in English, auxiliary volunteer, designated, during World War II, a member of different kinds of voluntary auxiliary forces made up of recruits indigenous to the territories of Eastern Europe occupied by Nazi Germany. Adolf Hitler reluctantly agreed to allow recruitment of Soviet citizens in the Rear Areas during Operation Barbarossa. In a short period of time, many of them were moved to combat units.

Overview
Hiwis comprised 50% of the 2nd Panzer Army's 134th Infantry Division in late 1942, while the 6th Army at the Battle of Stalingrad was composed of 25% Hiwis. By 1944, their numbers had grown to 600,000. Both men and women were recruited. Veteran Hiwis were practically indistinguishable from regular German troops, and often served in entire company strengths.

Between September 1941 and July 1944 the SS employed thousands of collaborationist auxiliary police recruited as Hiwis directly from the Soviet POW camps. After training, they were deployed for service with Nazi Germany, in the General Government, and the occupied East.

In one instance, the German SS and police inducted, processed, and trained 5,082 Hiwi guards before the end of 1944 at the SS training camp division of the Trawniki concentration camp set up in the village of Trawniki southeast of Lublin. They were known as the "Trawniki men" and were former Soviet citizens, mostly Ukrainians. Trawnikis were sent to all major killing sites of the "Final Solution", which was their training's primary purpose. They took an active role in the executions of Jews at Bełżec, Sobibor, Treblinka II, Warsaw (three times), Częstochowa, Lublin, Lvov, Radom, Kraków, Białystok (twice), Majdanek as well as Auschwitz, and Trawniki itself.

Use of term

The term 'Hiwis' acquired a thoroughly negative meaning during World War II when it entered into several other languages in reference to Ostlegionen as well as volunteers enlisted from occupied territories for service in a number of roles including hands-on shooting actions and guard duties at extermination camps on top of regular military service, drivers, cooks, hospital attendants, ammunition carriers, messengers, sappers, etc.

In the context of World War II the term has clear connotations of collaborationism, and in the case of the occupied Soviet territories also of anti-Bolshevism (widely presented as such by the Germans). 

German historian  wrote that there were many different reasons why Soviet citizens volunteered. He argues that the issue has to be seen first and foremost with the German Vernichtungskrieg (war of annihilation) policy in mind. For example, volunteering allowed Soviet POWs to get out of the barbaric German POW camp system, giving them a much higher chance of survival. During World War II, Nazi Germany engaged in a policy of deliberate maltreatment of Soviet POWs, in contrast to their treatment of British and American POWs. This resulted in some 3.3 to 3.5 million deaths, or 57% of all Soviet POWs. Therefore it becomes very difficult to differentiate between a genuine desire to volunteer, and seeming to volunteer in the hope of a better chance of surviving the war.

A captured Hiwi told his People's Commissariat for Internal Affairs (or NKVD) interrogators:

Soviet authorities referred to the Hiwis as "former Russians" regardless of the circumstances of their joining or their fate at the hands of the NKVD secret police. After the war, thousands attempted to return to their homes in the USSR. Hundreds were captured and prosecuted, charged with treason and therefore guilty of enlistment from the start of judicial proceedings. Most were sentenced to the Gulags, and released under the Khrushchev amnesty of 1955.

The reliance upon Hiwis exposed a gap between Nazi ideologues and pragmatic German Army commanders. Nazi leaders including Adolf Hitler regarded all Slavs as Untermenschen and therefore of limited value as volunteers also. On the other hand, the manpower was needed, and German Intelligence had recognised the need to divide the Soviet nationals. The contradiction was sometimes disguised by reclassification of Slavs as Cossacks. Colonel Helmuth Groscurth (XI Corps' Chief of Staff) wrote to General Beck: "It is disturbing that we are forced to strengthen our fighting troops with Russian prisoners of war, who are already being turned into gunners. It's an odd state of affairs that the "Beasts" we have been fighting against are now living with us in closest harmony." The Hiwis may have constituted one quarter of 6th Army's front-line strength, amounting to over 50,000 Slavic auxiliaries serving with the German troops.

See also
 Collaboration during World War II
 Waffen-SS foreign volunteers and conscripts
 Wehrmacht foreign volunteers and conscripts
 Schutzmannschaft
 Selbstschutz

References

Further reading
 Elizabeth M.F. Grasmeder, "Leaning on Legionnaires: Why Modern States Recruit Foreign Soldiers," International Security (July 2021), Vol 46 (No. 1), pp. 147–195.
 

Collaborators with Nazi Germany
Foreign volunteer units of Nazi Germany
Foreign volunteer units of the Wehrmacht
German military personnel of World War II
Military supporting service occupations